Discourse is a use of written or spoken communication.

Discourse or discourses may also refer to:
Domain of discourse, the collection of objects being discussed in a specific discourse
Discourse (linguistics), approaches to study written, vocal, or sign language use
Conversation, interactive, spontaneous communication between two or more people

Literature 
Discourses (Meher Baba), a book by Indian religious teacher Meher Baba
Discourses, a series of books by Greek historian of the Roman Empire Dio Chrysostom (c.40 – c.120)
Fihi Ma Fihi or Discourses of Rumi, a book by Jalal ad-Din Muhammad Rumi
Discourses (1609–1683), a 1701 book by Benjamin Whichcote, leader of the Cambridge Platonists
Discourse on the Arts and Sciences or First Discourse, an essay by philosopher Jean-Jacques Rousseau written in 1750
Discourse on Inequality or Second Discourse, a work by philosopher Jean-Jacques Rousseau written in 1754
Discourse on Metaphysics, a short treatise written by Gottfried Wilhelm Leibniz in 1686
Discourse on the Method a philosophical and autobiographical treatise published by René Descartes in 1637
Discourses of Epictetus, a series of books by the Greek Stoic philosopher Epictetus (c.55 - c.135)
Four discourses, four fundamental types of discourse identified by Jacques Lacan
Discourses on Livy, a 1531 book by Niccolò Machiavelli

Other uses 
Discourse (software), an open-source discussion platform software system

See also
Text (disambiguation)
Discorsi (disambiguation)